Tectaria estremerana is a rare species of fern known by the common name Puerto Rico halberd fern. It is endemic to Puerto Rico. It is a federally listed endangered species of the United States.

The rachis is hairy and the leaf is divided into a few elongated leaflets.

When this plant was placed on the United States' Endangered Species List it was known from a population of 23 individuals in Arecibo, Puerto Rico. Later more individuals were discovered in Río Abajo Commonwealth Forest and in the municipality of Florida.

References

estremerana
Ferns of the Americas
Endemic flora of Puerto Rico
Plants described in 1989
Ferns of the United States
Flora without expected TNC conservation status